"Winn Coma" is a song by Boss Hog, released exclusively in Australia as the second single from their 1995 album Boss Hog.

Track listing

All songs written by Boss Hog and produced by Cristina Martinez, Jon Spencer and Steve Fisk except where noted.

Band members

 Cristina Martinez
 Jon Spencer
 Jens Jurgensen
 Hollis Queens

Additional personnel

 Bil Emmons - engineering
 Howie Weinberg - mastering
 Dame Darcy - cover illustration
 Steve Halin - band photo
 Robert Fisher - design

1996 singles
1995 songs
Geffen Records singles